William Dewitt (1738 – July 18, 1813 ) was a South Carolina planter, lawyer, and politician who was a Captain in the American Revolutionary War.  He was a Member of the South Carolina House of Representatives 6 years after the signing of the Declaration of Independence.  He attended the South Carolina ratifying convention in Charleston. He was one of the delegates that agreed to ratify the Constitution of the United States of America.

Early life
William Dewitt was born in Fredericksburgh, Virginia to Martin Dewitt and Ellen Douthel.  William Dewitt was an educated man.  In 1764, he married Mary Devonald and had ten children.  Their first son John Dewitt was born in 1765.  Three years later Paul Revere protested the Stamp Act.  On October 4, 1768, the parish of Saint David in Craven County South Carolina was established.  William Dewitt was a member of the assembly. He was 30 years old.  The Boston Massacre took place on March 5, 1770.  William was elected Church Officer of Saint David Parish on April 20, 1772.  During colonial times matters were brought to public notice by the Grand Juries, both for Legislative action, and district regulation and control.  They presented grievances to the Colonial Commons House of Assembly.  William Dewitt was a member of the Grand Jury in the Cheraw region of South Carolina beginning 1772.

December 16, 1773, the Boston tea party occurred sending shockwaves throughout the colonies.  In 1773, William Dewitt was elected Counsel member of Saint David's parish.  He continued his work with the Grand Jury.   
One year later the First Continental Congress met from September 5 to October 26, 1774.  Edward Rutledge and John Rutledge were some of the delegates from South Carolina. By April 15, 1775, William Dewitt and the members of the Grand Jury in the Cheraw region were unhappy with the British Crown, and rebellion was about to ensue.  Dewitt was now 37 years old.  The first battles began in Massachusetts.   William Dewitt his father Martin Dewitt and both sons John and Charles took an active role in the American Revolution.

American Revolution

On, May 10, 1775, the Second Continental Congress was held.  Representatives from 12 of the colonies met in Philadelphia including Edward Rutledge and John Rutledge from South Carolina. The provincial congress of South Carolina established the Parish Committee of Observation for Saint David's Parish on June 22, 1775.  William Dewitt was on the committee. 
 
On March 26, 1776, due to the ongoing conflict and civil unrest William Dewitt was nominated Justice of the Peace.  Four of the signers of the Declaration of Independence were from South Carolina including Edward Rutledge.  Saint David's parish served as a hospital to wounded British soldiers and many dead soldiers were buried in its churchyard. The Parish also served as quarters for the South Carolina Militia.  Over 200 battles were fought in South Carolina, and nearly one-third of the American Revolution was fought in South Carolina.

On December 13, 1777, Saint David's (Society) Academy was founded to promote education in the Cheraw area.  Dewitt was a member of the Society.  Dewitt was now addressed as 
Captain in the American Revolution. They established a school during wartime.  William Dewitt and the Grand Jury met again and published their grievances to the crown of England. South Carolina established a constitution and Saint David's was entitled to one senator and six representatives. The war began to consume South Carolina, battles were everywhere and Captain William Dewitt took part in many of them.

A band of British were on their way to Coosawhatchie South Carolina with 2400 soldiers.  General Moultrie marched all his troops including Captain Dewitt to Coosawhatchie.  A massive battle ensued on May 3, 1779.  The Continental Army retreated due to massive disorganization. This weakened the morale of the Continental Army and South Carolina was considering surrendering to the British.  Captain DeWitt's wife and son, John DeWitt, sixteen years of age, were harassed at their house by a party of British.  John DeWitt was cut on the head with a sword by an officer, inflicting a scar that he carried to his grave.  Subsequently, Captain DeWitt's house on cedar creek was burned by Tories along with all his personal belongings.  Dewitt's family was endangered.  As the British approached Captain Dewitt took his family to Guilford North Carolina for their safety. He returned immediately to take an active part in the American Revolution until the close of the war.  On March 3, 1781, Captain William Dewitt Donated 480 pounds of pork to feed the guards at Kolbs Ferry.

September 1781, General Francis Marion, also known as the Swamp Fox was Captain Dewitt's superior officer.  By September 17, 1781, Governor John Rutledge wrote to General Marion, informing him that Colonel Lemuel Benton's regiment was part of his brigade. Rutledge allowed General Marion to hold special elections. William Dewitt was elected to the House of Representatives for Saint David's.  William Dewitt, and William Pegues, were two of six representatives elected for Saint David's and took their seats in the House on January 18, 1882.  The location was Jacksonborough South Carolina.

Road to Constitution

In 1883 William Dewitt was re-elected to the Assembly but 2 months later Dewitt was elected Sheriff and he vacated his seat in the Assembly.  The American Revolution ended on September 3, 1783.  On November 30, 1784, Captain William Dewitt was elected Senator of South Carolina. By March 21, 1785, he was also elected Justice for Darlington County, he was also still a Senator.  On August 13, 1785, Saint Davids society (Academy) the prominent institution of education and philanthropy continued to flourish.  William Dewitt was the vice-president. By 1788, he resigned his participation in the Saint David's (society) Academy. He attended the South Carolina ratifying convention in Charleston.

Congress of the Confederation was established between 1781 and 1789.  Many different members were from South Carolina.   The newly formed government was trying to establish a uniform government.  A constitutional convention was held in Philadelphia but many states did not want to give up their rights as independent government bodies.  Each state held a special ratifying convention.  Delegates from each state had to ratify the new document.  William Dewitt was one of the delegates from South Carolina.

Later life
Georgia and South Carolina were slave states that were committed to the institution of slavery.  They were part of the southern states that had to include slavery in the U.S. Constitution or it would not be ratified.  Slavery was abolished in 7 of the 13 colonies by 1790.  South Carolina politics became very complicated in the 1790s land ownership became a necessity to hold office.  The large platers were given more political power which disturbed Saint David's political participation in government.  William Dewitt was required to own a certain amount of land to represent the local constituents.  Records indicated that William Dewitt took on large land ownership which was beyond his means.

The wealthy aristocracy of South Carolina made the requirement that state Congressman had to own 500 acres and ten slaves while Senators had to own double.  Here are the names of South Carolina state Congressman and Senators that took out loans to purchase land and slaves to remain in office after the 1790 constitutional requirement.  The following 12 lawmakers all took out loans to stay in office: Samuel Little, James Kennedy, Joseph Brown, Philemon Waters, Henry Pendleton, Richard Hampton, John Mayrant, William Clay Snipes, Roger P. Saunders, John Budd, Benjamin Hicks, and William Dewitt.  Both Benjamin Hicks and William Dewitt represented Saint David's Parish.  Philemon Waters boldly sent a letter to President George Washington asking for a land grant. The aforementioned 12 lawmakers were also members of the South Carolina convention that ratified the US Constitution.  The statesmen that fought for independence and ratified the Constitution of the United States now could not afford to stay in office.  According to records they took out loans to stay in office but the loans were in default. These were all men of high moral character and leaders in our new nation and embarrassed publicly by the publication of default.  Regrettably, the ownership requirement law was not abolished until the American Civil War.

Senator William Dewitt continued to participate in local government abiding by the standards set of the time.  He passed laws and helped develop South Carolina building bridges, highways and roads. Under his tenure they also added ferries. In 1806, now 68 years old he continued serving the South Carolina Senate.  Saint David's Academy continued to flourish.  In 1804, notable Professor of Languages and Yale graduate Enoch Hanford taught at the institution and married William Dewitt's Daughter Margaret.

By the turn of the century, William Dewitt was recorded owning nearly 55 slaves but records also reveal him selling large tracts of land with thousands of acres. William Dewitt died at 75 years old on July 18, 1813, slightly after the death of his wife.  He left a sizable fortune to his heirs.  Dewitt's will recorded 9 remaining slaves which were 2 families.  He gave them to his two daughters.  Dorothea Dewitt inherited Harry and his family Henry, Jack, and Solomon.  Harriett Dewitt Inherited Charles and his family Caesar, Cate, Isham, and Jeff.

His legacy continued: U.S. Senator Josiah J. Evans married his daughter Dorothea.  His granddaughter Mary married the nephew of Brigadier General David Rogerson Williams and his other granddaughter married the first U.S. Consul to Greece Gregory Anthony Perdicaris.  His Great Grand Children included Chief Justice of the South Carolina Supreme Court Henry McIver and Ion Hanford Perdicaris.

References

Bibliography

 

1738 births
1813 deaths
Members of the South Carolina House of Representatives
South Carolina state senators
Politicians from Fredericksburg, Virginia
18th-century American military personnel
18th-century American politicians
American planters
American rebels
American slave owners
Continental Army officers from South Carolina